River: The Joni Letters is the forty-fifth studio album by American jazz pianist Herbie Hancock, released on September 25, 2007, by Verve. It is a tribute album featuring cover songs of music written by Canadian singer-songwriter Joni Mitchell.

The album peaked at number five on the US Billboard 200, enjoying a huge post-Grammy winning sales boost. Upon its release, River: The Joni Letters received generally positive reviews from critics and earned several accolades, including Grammy Awards for Album of the Year and Best Contemporary Jazz Album at the 50th Annual Grammy Awards. Hancock’s quintet for the album are saxophonist Wayne Shorter, guitarist Lionel Loueke, bassist Dave Holland and drummer Vinnie Colaiuta.

Background
Hancock is a longtime friend of Mitchell's, and both he and saxophonist Wayne Shorter, who plays throughout the album, had previously collaborated with Mitchell on her 1979 album Mingus, and both continued to work with her on occasion ever since.

Guest vocalists on River include Leonard Cohen, Tina Turner, Norah Jones, Corinne Bailey Rae, Luciana Souza and Mitchell herself.

Reception

Critical reception 

The album won the Grammy Award for Album of the Year in 2008.

Commercial performance 
The album peaked at number 5 on the Billboard 200 after enjoying a huge post-Grammy sales boost. It also peaked at number 61 in Switzerland, number 70 in France and number 76 in the Netherlands.

Accolades 
On February 10, 2008, the album won the Album of the Year and Best Contemporary Jazz Album at the 50th Annual Grammy Awards. Hancock was competing with Kanye West, Foo Fighters, Amy Winehouse, and Vince Gill for the Album of the Year award. River was the third jazz album to win Album of the Year in the award's history. The first was The Music from Peter Gunn by Henry Mancini in 1959. The second was Getz/Gilberto by Stan Getz and João Gilberto in 1965. The track "Both Sides Now" was also nominated for Best Jazz Instrumental. Since River received the Album of the Year award, the highest honor at the Grammys, no other act of Afro-American or black ethnicity won it until 2022.

Track listing
All songs were written by Joni Mitchell, except where noted.
"Court and Spark"  – 7:35
"Edith and the Kingpin"  – 6:32
"Both Sides Now" – 7:38
"River"  – 5:25
"Sweet Bird" – 8:15
"Tea Leaf Prophecy"  (Joni Mitchell, Larry Klein) – 6:34
"Solitude" (Eddie DeLange, Duke Ellington, Irving Mills) – 5:42
"Amelia"  – 7:26
"Nefertiti" (Wayne Shorter) – 7:30
"The Jungle Line"  – 5:00

Bonus tracks

The Amazon.com exclusive version of the album includes two bonus tracks:
<li value=11>"A Case of You" – 7:36
"All I Want"  – 4:15

The iTunes Store digital version includes two bonus tracks:

<li value=11>"Harlem in Havana"
"I Had a King"</ol>

All four bonus tracks were released on the 10th anniversary reissue of the album in 2017.

Personnel
 Herbie Hancock – piano
 Wayne Shorter – soprano and tenor saxophone
 Lionel Loueke – guitar
 Dave Holland – bass
 Vinnie Colaiuta – drums

Charts

References

External links
 The Best Jazz of 2007: 3) River: The Joni Letters at PopMatters

2007 albums
Albums produced by Larry Klein
Grammy Award for Album of the Year
Grammy Award for Best Contemporary Jazz Album
Herbie Hancock albums
Joni Mitchell tribute albums